Muryongsan is a mountain located in Buk District and Dong District, Ulsan, South Korea.

See also
Geography of Korea
List of South Korean tourist attractions
List of mountains in Korea
List of mountains by elevation
Mountain portal
South Korea portal

References

Mountains of Ulsan
Mountains of South Gyeongsang Province
Buk District, Ulsan
Dong District, Ulsan
Tourist attractions in Ulsan
Mountains of South Korea
Mountains of North Jeolla Province